Vrydagzynea elongata, commonly known as the tonsil orchid, is a species of orchid that is native to New Guinea, the Maluku Islands and far north Queensland. It has between four and seven dark green, egg-shaped leaves and a large number of white resupinate flowers which barely open.

Description 
The dorsal sepal and petals overlap and form a hood over the column. Flowering occurs in most months.

in 2004, David Jones and Mark Clements described Vrydagzynea grayi from a specimen collected by Bruce Gray in part of what is now the Daintree National Park and the description was published in The Orchadian. The name V. grayi is now regarded as a synonym of V. elongata.

Taxonomy and naming
Vrydagzynea elongata was first formally described in 1858 by Carl Ludwig Blume from specimens collected in New Guinea in 1841. The description was published in his books Flora Javae et insularum adjacentium and Collection des orchidées les plus remarquables de l'Archipel indien et du Japon in the same year.

Distribution and habitat
The tonsil orchid grows in forest including rainforest and forests in swamps near river mouths, and occurs in the Maluku Islands, New Guinea and in the Mossman to Daintree areas of far north Queensland.

References

elongata
Orchids of Queensland
Plants described in 1858
Taxa named by Carl Ludwig Blume